Colin Edward McGarry (born 22 July 1965) is a Northern Irish former professional darts player who played in Professional Darts Corporation tournaments. His the nickname The Chief.

Career

McGarry qualified for the 2004 PDC World Darts Championship where he beat Rory Orvis 3-0 and Mark Holden 3–0 to reach the third round, losing 4–0 to Phil Taylor. Despite his good showing in Purfleet, McGarry failed to maintain his performances, failing to qualify for the 2006 World Matchplay and the 2006 and 2007 World Championship.

McGarry caused a real surprise in the Grand Slam of Darts Wildcard Qualifier where he reached the final, beating Mark Dudbridge and Jamie Caven along the way, but lost in the final to Wes Newton. The result meant McGarry took one of the reserved spots for the event and eventually earned qualification. He was drawn into Group C with Mervyn King, Dutch wonderkid Michael van Gerwen and BDO World Champion Mark Webster. McGarry went on to score a big upset win over Webster in a final leg decider in his opening group game. However, defeats to King and van Gerwen meant that the Ulsterman would be eliminated in the group stages.

McGarry qualified for the 2014 PDC World Darts Championship by winning the 2013 Irish Matchplay, defeating Connie Finnan six legs to four. He lost to Per Laursen 4–2 in the preliminary round.

World Championship results

PDC
 2004: Last 32: (lost to Phil Taylor 0–4) (sets)
 2014: Last 72: (lost to Per Laursen 2–4) (legs)

WSDT
 2023: First round (lost to Phil Taylor 2-3)

References

External links
Profile and stats on Darts Database

1965 births
Living people
Darts players from Northern Ireland
British Darts Organisation players
Professional Darts Corporation associate players